is a railway station in the city of Anjō, Aichi, Japan, operated by Meitetsu.

Lines

Station layout
The station has dual opposed side platforms. The platforms are not interconnecting, and any passengers wishing to change platforms must leave the station and re-enter after crossing the tracks via a public road. The station is unattended.

Platforms

Adjacent stations

Station history
Minami Sakurai Station was opened on June 29, 2008.

Passenger statistics
In fiscal 2017, the station was used by an average of 5,635 passengers daily (boarding passengers only).

Surrounding area
Aishin AW head office

See also
 List of Railway Stations in Japan

References

External links

 Official web page 

Railway stations in Japan opened in 2008
Railway stations in Aichi Prefecture
Stations of Nagoya Railroad
Anjō, Aichi